Hebei Football Club is a professional Chinese football club that participates in the Chinese Super League division under licence from the Chinese Football Association (CFA). The team is based in Langfang, Hebei and their home stadium is the Langfang Stadium that has a seating capacity of 30,000. Their current owners are real estate developers China Fortune Land Development who took over the club on 27 January 2015.

According to Forbes, Hebei are the 7th most valuable football team in China, with a team value of $90 million, and an estimated revenue of $22 million in 2015.

History
Hebei Zhongji was founded on 28 May 2010 by the Hebei football association and Hebei Zhongji Group who promised to invest three million Yuan a season for next four campaigns. They registered to play within China League Two, third tier of the Chinese football league system, as Hebei Yilin Shanzhuang (Simplified Chinese: 河北依林山庄) for sponsorship reasons in the 2011 league season. They failed to advance into the Play-offs after finishing in 5th place in the group stage. On 17 October 2011, the cooperation relationship between Hebei FA and Hebei Zhongji Group was terminated and Hebei Zhongji Group took full ownership of the club while the players who were owned by Hebei FA split into a new team called Hebei Youth. In the 2012 league season, Hebei Zhongji finished in 1st place in the North Group with 18 wins, 5 draws and only 1 defeat, however they were knocked out in the quarter-finals of the Play-offs by Hubei China-Kyle with the score at 1–1, losing on the away goals rule. On 16 August 2013 Guo Ruilong was brought in to manage the team for the rest of the 2013 league season, however during his brief tenure at the club he quickly led them to promotion after finishing runners-up at the end of the campaign. Huang Yang was brought in to coach the team during the off season while on December 26, 2013 the club announced that Uruguayan Nelson Agresta would be the club's first foreign manager.

On 27 January 2015, they changed the team name to Hebei China Fortune (Simplified Chinese: 河北华夏幸福 ) after being purchased by China Fortune Land Development. Serbian manager Radomir Antić signed a three-year contract with the club on the same day. They changed the club name to Hebei China Fortune F.C. in December 2015 after winning promotion to Chinese Super League in the 2015 season. The club has since expanded its bid for league success by landing international stars such as Gervinho and Ezequiel Lavezzi.  In August 2016, the Chilean Manuel Pellegrini became manager of the club, as part of a larger plan for Hebei China Fortune F.C. and Chinese football to make a great leap forward by the end of the decade. This process continued with the appointment of Chris Coleman on 10 June 2018.

Ownership and naming history

Current squad

First team squad

Reserve squad
As of 1 March 2019

Out on loan

Coaching staff

Managerial history

Results
All-time league rankings

As of the end of 2019 season.

 In group stage.

Key
<div>

 Pld = Played
 W = Games won
 D = Games drawn
 L = Games lost
 F = Goals for
 A = Goals against
 Pts = Points
 Pos = Final position

 DNQ = Did Not Qualify
 DNE = Did Not Enter
 NH = Not Held
 – = Does Not Exist
 R1 = Round 1
 R2 = Round 2
 R3 = Round 3
 R4 = Round 4

 F = Final
 SF = Semi-finals
 QF = Quarter-finals
 R16 = Round of 16
 Group = Group stage
 GS2 = Second Group stage
 QR1 = First Qualifying Round
 QR2 = Second Qualifying Round
 QR3 = Third Qualifying Round

References

External links
Official site 

 
Chinese Super League clubs
2010 establishments in China
Association football clubs established in 2010
Qinhuangdao
Sport in Hebei